TortoiseCVS is a CVS client for Microsoft Windows released under the GNU General Public License. Unlike most CVS tools, it includes itself in Windows' shell by adding entries in the contextual menu of the file explorer, therefore it does not run in its own window. Moreover, it adds icons onto files and directories controlled by CVS, giving additional information to the user without having to run a full-scale stand-alone application.

The name is a pun on the word shell (computing, turtle). The tortoise in the logo is called Charlie Vernon Smythe (CVS).

The project was started by Francis Irving when he was employed by Creature Labs to provide a better interface to CVS for his colleagues.  Some of the code was derived from WinCVS and CVSNT.  The first release was 4 August 2000.

Criticism
TortoiseCVS will always add argument "-c" to most CVS operations when communicating with a CVS server. This causes standard non-CVSNT servers to fail as these are not aware of this argument.

Ports and forks

 TortoiseSVN, a similar tool for use with Subversion, inspired by TortoiseCVS 
 TortoiseDarcs, a similar tool for use with Darcs, derived from TortoiseCVS 
 TortoiseBzr, a similar tool for use with Bazaar, inspired by TortoiseCVS and TortoiseSVN 
 TortoiseHg, a similar tool for Mercurial 
 TortoiseGit, a port of TortoiseSVN to Git using msysgit 
 git-cheetah, a similar tool for use with Git 
 Dubbelbock TFS is a similar tool for use with Team Foundation Server

References

External links
 

Concurrent Versions System
Free version control software
Free software programmed in C++
Windows-only free software
Version control GUI tools
Software that uses wxWidgets